Arc of a Diver is the second solo studio album by singer/multi-instrumentalist Steve Winwood. Released in 1980, Winwood played all of the instruments on the album.

Featuring his first solo hit, "While You See a Chance" (which peaked at number 7 on the Billboard Hot 100 in the United States), this was Winwood's breakthrough album as a solo artist. It peaked at number 3 on the Billboard 200 album chart, establishing him as a commercially viable act.

The cover artwork for the album is by Tony Wright. He took inspiration from Jazz by Henri Matisse, notably VIII: Icarus.

Recording
The album was recorded at Winwood's Netherturkdonic Studios, built at his farm in Gloucestershire; he played all the instruments, wrote all the music, and produced and engineered it himself.

Critical reception

Reviewing for The Village Voice in June 1981, Robert Christgau credited Winwood for overdubbing all his self-performed instruments, but still found his brand of "British-international groove" more atmospheric than song-oriented and ultimately "lulling". Robert Palmer was more enthusiastic in The New York Times, saying that Winwood has transformed himself into a "rock traditionalist" with the album. While highlighting "Dust" and the album's title track as "first-rate lyrics", Palmer said that "Winwood's impressive playing and arranging and utterly distinctive vocals make several of his collaborations with Will Jennings, especially the brooding 'Night Train,' almost as memorable." In a retrospective review for AllMusic, William Ruhlmann wrote of the album, "Utterly unencumbered by the baggage of his long years in the music business, Winwood reinvents himself as a completely contemporary artist on this outstanding album, leading off with his best solo song, "While You See a Chance.""

The album was included in the book 1001 Albums You Must Hear Before You Die, and was voted number 455 in the third edition (2000) of Colin Larkin's All Time Top 1000 Albums.

Track listing
All songs written by Steve Winwood and Will Jennings except where noted.

Original release
Side one
 "While You See a Chance" – 5:12
 "Arc of a Diver" (Winwood, Vivian Stanshall) – 5:28
 "Second-Hand Woman" (Winwood, George Fleming) – 3:41
 "Slowdown Sundown" – 5:27

Side two
 "Spanish Dancer" – 5:58
 "Night Train" – 7:51
 "Dust" (Winwood, Fleming) – 6:20

2012 Deluxe reissue
Tracks 1–7 on disc one, per the 1980 release, with disc two containing bonus tracks.
 "Arc of a Diver" [edited US single version] (Winwood, Stanshall) – 4:16
 "Night Train" [instrumental version] – 6:44
 "Spanish Dancer" [2010 version] – 6:13
 "Arc of a Diver: The Steve Winwood Story" [originally aired on BBC Radio 2] – 56:33

Personnel 
 Steve Winwood – lead and backing vocals, Prophet-5, Minimoog, Yamaha CS-80, Hammond B3 organ, Steinway piano, Ovation acoustic guitar, Fender Stratocaster electric guitar, Ibanez mandolin, bass, Multimoog (also used for keyboard fretless bass), Hayman and Ludwig drums, Linn LM-1 programming, percussion, producer, engineer, mixing

 John "Nobby" Clarke – additional engineer
 John Dent – mastering at The Sound Clinic (London, UK)
 Tony Wright – artwork 
 Fin Costello – photography

Charts

Weekly charts

Year-end charts

Certifications

Chart singles

References

External links

Arc of a Diver (Adobe Flash) at Radio3Net (streamed copy where licensed)

1980 albums
Steve Winwood albums
Island Records albums
Albums produced by Steve Winwood
Soft rock albums by English artists